Marshallville Historic District is located in Marshallville, Upper Township, Cape May County, New Jersey, United States. The district was added to the National Register of Historic Places on November 28, 1989.

See also
National Register of Historic Places listings in Cape May County, New Jersey

References

Historic districts on the National Register of Historic Places in New Jersey
Houses on the National Register of Historic Places in New Jersey
Geography of Cape May County, New Jersey
National Register of Historic Places in Cape May County, New Jersey
Upper Township, New Jersey
New Jersey Register of Historic Places